Fivepenny is one of the many villages in the Lewis district of Ness (Nis in Gaelic) and part of the Isle of Lewis, Outer Hebrides, Scotland. Fivepenny is within the parish of Barvas, and is situated on the B8014, between Port of Ness and Eoropie.

There are two separate places with this name, both in the north-west of Lewis. Furthest north in Ness the full name of the village there is Còig Peighinnean Nis, and in the Borve area further south of the village there is Còig Peighinnean Bhuirgh. Both are known locally as Na Còig Peighinnean, the full name only being used to distinguish one from the other.

Name
The name refers to the fact that it is made up of five pennylands.

See also 

 Lewis and Harris
 History of the Outer Hebrides

References

External links 

 Visitor's guide for the Isle of Lewis
 Website of the Western Isles Council with links to other resources
 Disabled access to Lewis for residents and visitors
 
 A Guide to living in the Outer Hebrides, with most information pertaining to Lewis 

Villages in the Isle of Lewis